Samuel Arnold (10 August 1740 – 22 October 1802) was an English composer and organist.

Arnold was born in London (his mother is said to have been Princess Amelia; his father was Thomas Arnold). He began writing music for the theatre in about the year 1764. A few years later, he became the director of music at Marylebone Gardens, for which he wrote much of his popular music. In 1777, he worked for George Colman the Elder at the Little Theatre, Haymarket. In 1783, he became organist at the Chapel Royal and in 1793 he became the organist at Westminster Abbey, where he was eventually buried. He also wrote the earliest version of Humpty Dumpty. He was a close friend and associate of Haydn.

Works
Arnold's best-known works include:

The Maid of the Mill (1765)
Abimelech (1768)
The Prodigal Son (1773)
Incidental music for Macbeth (1778)
The Baron Kinkvervankotsdorsprakingatchdern (1781)
The Castle of Andalusia (1782)
Two to One (1784), libretto George Colman. Includes the song "Pensive I Mourn".
Turk and No Turk (1785)
                                           Inkle and Yarico (1787)
                                           Juvenile Amusements (1797)

He is also known for producing the first collected edition of the works of George Frideric Handel between 1787 and 1797, published in 180 parts. This was the most comprehensive collection of Handel's music prior to the appearance of the Händel-Gesellschaft edition in the next century.

Bibliography

References

External links

 
 

1740 births
1802 deaths
18th-century British composers
18th-century male musicians
18th-century musicians
18th-century keyboardists
19th-century British composers
19th-century organists
English classical composers
English opera composers
English classical organists
English male classical composers
British male organists
Male opera composers
Musicians from London
House of Hanover
Members of the Academy of Ancient Music
Master of the Choristers at Westminster Abbey
Burials at Westminster Abbey
19th-century British male musicians
Male classical organists